Trio + Strings is an album by pianist John Hicks, recorded in 1997.

Recording and music
The album was recorded at Mapleshade Studio, Upper Marlboro, Maryland, on September 23, 24, and 27, 1997. The compositions were by Hicks, with the exception of "Passion Flower". The string arrangements were by Larry Willis.

Release
Trio + Strings was released by Mapleshade Records.

Reception

The Penguin Guide to Jazz commented that it was "Not our favourite Hicks record by any means but an accomplished and pleasing record." JazzTimes stated that Hicks' writing "evokes Strayhorn [...] Evans, Ibrahim, and perhaps even Elmo Hope".

Track listing
All compositions are by John Hicks, except where noted.

"Heart to Heart"
"Minor Collaboration"
"Peace for E.H."
"Two Heart Beats"
"The Wandering Soul"
"Naima's Love Song"
"Passion Flower" (Billy Strayhorn)
"After the Dawn"
"West Side Winds"
"No More Regrets"

Personnel
John Hicks – piano
Elise Wood – flute
Steve Novosel – bass
Ronnie Burrage – drums (tracks 1, 3, 5–10)
Steve Williams – drums (tracks 2, 4)
Rick Schmidt – cello
Debbie Baker – viola
Charles Olive – violin
Tom Ginsberg – violin

References

John Hicks (jazz pianist) albums
1997 albums